Kurokopteryx is a genus of small primitive metallic moths in the family Micropterigidae.

Species
Kurokopteryx dolichocerata Hashimoto, 2006

Micropterigidae
Moth genera